Charles II (Charles Louis Frederick; 10 October 1741 – 6 November 1816) was ruler of the state of Mecklenburg-Strelitz from 1794 until his death. Originally ruling as duke, he was raised to the rank of grand duke in 1815. Prior to succeeding to the throne, he served as Governor of Hanover from 1776 to 1786.

Early life and service in Hanover
Duke Charles Louis Frederick of Mecklenburg was born in Mirow, the second son of Duke Charles Louis Frederick of Mecklenburg and his wife Princess Elisabeth Albertine of Saxe-Hildburghausen. On 11 December 1752 his uncle Adolphus Frederick III died and was succeeded by Charles's older brother, who became Adolphus Frederick IV. With his brother's accession Charles was taken with the rest of the family from Mirow to the capital Strelitz.

From the age of four, Charles looked set for a career in Hanoverian service after being given a Captain's commission. His sister Charlotte married the Elector of Hanover, King George III of the United Kingdom on 8 September 1761. Charles made frequent visits to his sister in Great Britain and he ultimately entered the service of his brother-in-law the Elector of Hanover with a chief military appointment at Hanover following service in Spain.

In the autumn of 1776, Charles was appointed governor-general of Hanover by his brother-in-law. As Governor of Hanover, Charles effectively held all the powers of a sovereign ruler. His brother-in-law had no wish to reside in Germany, being thoroughly English. Shortly after being widowed for a second time in December 1785, Charles requested permission to retire from his military employments in Hanover and resign the governorship. His brother-in-law granted his request,  promoted Charles to the rank of field marshal and granted him a pension. Charles then spent some time traveling before settling down in Darmstadt, where he became President of the Imperial Credit Commission.

Following the death of his childless older brother Adolf Friedrich IV on 2 June 1794, Charles succeeded him as the ruling Duke of Mecklenburg-Strelitz.

Ruler of Mecklenburg-Strelitz
As ruler, Charles encouraged new agricultural trends, established a new police force, and implemented compulsory education. In 1806, his duchy joined the Confederation of the Rhine. Following the Congress of Vienna, he was elevated to the rank of grand duke on 28 June 1815.

In the summer of 1816 Charles went on a tour of Rebberg, Schwalbach and Hildburghausen. Shortly after returning he was taken ill with inflammation of the lungs. He died in Neustrelitz after suffering a fit of apoplexy. He was succeeded by his eldest son Georg.

Marriages and children
After unsuccessful attempts to marry a Princess of Denmark and a Princess of Saxe-Gotha, Charles married as his first wife Princess Friederike of Hesse-Darmstadt, a daughter of Prince George William of Hesse-Darmstadt on 18 September 1768 in Darmstadt. They had ten children together. Two of the daughters became German queens consort.
 Duchess Charlotte Georgine of Mecklenburg-Strelitz (1769–1818) married Frederick, Duke of Saxe-Altenburg
 Duchess Caroline Auguste of Mecklenburg (1771–1773)
 Duke Georg Carl of Mecklenburg (1772–1773)
 Duchess Therese of Mecklenburg (1773–1839) married Karl Alexander, 5th Prince of Thurn and Taxis
 Duke Friedrich Georg of Mecklenburg (1774–1774)
 Duchess Louise of Mecklenburg (1776–1810) married Frederick William III of Prussia
 Duchess Frederica of Mecklenburg (1778–1841) married (1) Prince Louis Charles of Prussia (2) Frederick William, Prince of Solms-Braunfels (3) Ernest Augustus, King of Hanover
 George, Grand Duke of Mecklenburg-Strelitz (1779–1860)
 Duke Friedrich Karl of Mecklenburg (1781–1783)
 Duchess Auguste Albertine of Mecklenburg (1782–1782)

After Friederike's death in 1782, Charles married her sister Princess Charlotte of Hesse-Darmstadt on 28 September 1784 in Darmstadt. Charlotte died on 12 December 1785 shortly after giving birth to their son Duke Charles of Mecklenburg (1785–1837).

Ancestry

References

1741 births
1816 deaths
Protestant monarchs
Dukes of Mecklenburg-Strelitz
House of Mecklenburg-Strelitz
People from Mirow